Lampertheim is a commune of the Bas-Rhin department in Grand Est in north-eastern France.

The town shares a large shopping centre (Parc commercial Strasbourg nord) with the neighbouring communes of Mundolsheim und Vendenheim.

People
Léo Schnugg, artist and painter, was born at Lampertheim in 1878. He would die at Brumath-Stephansfeld on 15 December 1933; his body being returned to Lampertheim where his grave can be visited in the town cemetery.

See also
 Communes of the Bas-Rhin department

References

Communes of Bas-Rhin
Bas-Rhin communes articles needing translation from French Wikipedia